Bruges lace (Brugs Bloemwerk) is a fine white part lace made of cotton. It is made in pieces, with the designs later joined together to make the final lace.

Types 
There are 2 types of Bruges lace, which include the finer flower-work type and the rough variant. The finer type, called Bruges Duchess' lace, is often used in clothing and veils, while the rough type is used for interior decorations. It has the characteristics of being quite simple to take care of, and can be washed and bleached at high temperatures without loss of form or quality. Bruges lace was in high production between 1850-1950.
 
Bruges flower lace is assembled from elegant leaves, long scrolls, and open flowers. They often have typical patterns and can be produced in large pieces for use in formal settings, such as churches. These features are joined together with plaits with picots, fillings, leaf plaits and braids.

A modern lace school in Bruges, called the Kantcentrum, delivers lace courses and workshops. It also runs its own publishing house for books and lace patterns.

References

Textile arts of Belgium
Bobbin lace